Aris Konstantinidis (4 March 1913 – 18 September 1993) was a Greek modernist architect.

Aris Konstantinidis was born in Athens and studied architecture at the Technical University of Munich from 1931 to 1936, where he came into contact with the Modern Movement in architecture. He returned to Greece in 1936 and worked for the Town Planning Department of the city of Athens and for the Ministry of Public Works. He was appointed head of the Workers Housing Organisation from 1955 to 1975 and from 1957 to 1967 of the Technical Service of the Greek National Tourism Organisation, where he planned and oversaw the construction of a series of workers' houses and  Xenia hotels. At the same time, Konstantinidis planned and realised several private projects like the emblematic Weekend House in Anavyssos.

He devoted extensive study to the anonymous architecture of Greece and between 1947 and 1953 published three books in which he examined particular examples of this type of architecture. In 1975 he published a comprehensive book concerning the anonymous architecture of Greece, entitled Elements of Self-knowledge: Towards a true architecture, in which it is apparent how much he was influenced by the architectural tradition of his homeland and how he drew lessons from the past to develop an architecture for his time. In his last book, entitled Theoktista ("God-built"), the architect once again underlined his belief that anonymous architecture as well as the landscape of Greece itself constituted the foundations on which modern architectural practice could and should be grounded.

He taught at the Zurich Polytechnic as a visiting professor. In 1978 he received an honorary doctorate from the University of Thessaloniki. He was appointed a corresponding member of the Academy of Fine Arts, Munich.

Through his work, Aris Konstantinidis created architectural solutions unique in Greece, which gave birth to a modern Greek architecture.

Personal life 
In 1951 Konstantinidis married the famous Greek sculptor Natalia Mela. They had two children: Dimitris Konstantinidis is also an architect and Alexandra Tsoukala is a light designer.

Notable works 
 Weekend House in Anavyssos
 Ioannina Archaeological Museum
 Xenia Hotel in Kalambaka
 Xenia Hotel in Mykonos

 Komotini Archaeological Museum
 Xenia Hotel in Olympia
 Low-income housing in Athens
 Low-income housing in Irakleio
 Low-income housing in Serres
 Low-income housing in Pyrgos

Written works 
 1947- Two "Villages" from Mykonos (Δυο "Χωριά" από τη Μύκονο)
 1950 - Old Athenian Houses (Τα παλιά Αθηναϊκά σπίτια)
 1953 - Country churches of Mykonos (Ξωκλήσια της Μυκόνου)
 1972 - Vessels for Life or The problem of a genuine architecture (Δοχεία Ζωής ή το πρόβλημα για μια αληθινή αρχιτεκτονική)
 1975- Elements for self-knowledge - towards a true architecture (Στοιχεία αυτογνωσίας - Για μιαν αληθινή αρχιτεκτονική)
 1978 - True contemporary architecture (Σύγχρονη Αληθινή Αρχιτεκτονική)
 1987 - On architecture (Για την Αρχιτεκτονική)
 1987 - Sinners and thieves or The take-off of architecture (Αμαρτωλοί και κλέφτες ή Η απογείωση της αρχιτεκτονικής)
 1989 - Forwards from forthcoming books (Τα προλεγόμενα / από τα βιβλία που βρίσκονται στα σκαριά)
 1991 - Wretched timeliness - The golden Olympics - The Acropolis Museum (Η άθλια επικαιρότητα - Η χρυσή ολυμπιάδα - Το μουσείο της ακρόπολης)
 1992 - Experiences and facts - an autobiographical narrative (Εμπειρίες και περιστατικά - μια αυτοβιογραφική διήγηση)
 1992 - The architecture of architecture - Notes from a Journal (Η Αρχιτεκτονική της Αρχιτεκτονικής- Ημερολογιακά σημειώματα)
 1992 - Aris Konstandinidis - Projects & Buildings (Αρης Κωνσταντινίδης: Μελέτες και κατασκευές')
 1992 - "God-Built" ("Θεόκτιστα")

 See also 
 List of museums in Greece

 References 
2. Kiourti, M. and Tsiambaos, K. "The architect, the resident, and a murder: the case of a house by Aris Konstantinidis". arq: Architectural Research Quarterly, Volume 24, Issue 1, March 2020, pp. 83-94. DOI: https://doi.org/10.1017/S1359135520000093
 Aris Konstandinidis - Buildings & Projects'', Athens, Agra, 1991
 "Biography (in Greek) of the architect"

External links 
 Xenia Hotel in Paliouri
 

1913 births
1993 deaths
Architects from Athens
Greek art critics
Technical University of Munich alumni
Academic staff of ETH Zurich
20th-century Greek architects
Herder Prize recipients